Begonia glabra, the climbing sorrel, is a species of flowering plant in the family Begoniaceae, native to the New World Tropics. An unusual vining begonia, it is popular in vivariums. Its use in the Winti Afro-Surinamese traditional religion has led to local over-collection.

References

glabra
Flora of Mexico
Flora of Central America
Flora of Cuba
Flora of Jamaica
Flora of Trinidad and Tobago
Flora of northern South America
Flora of western South America
Flora of North Brazil
Flora of Northeast Brazil
Flora of Southeast Brazil
Plants described in 1775
Flora without expected TNC conservation status